Siski is a weekly television drama series by Neena Gupta which ran on Star Plus in 2000,

Plot
Siski is the story of three memorable characters and the impact of their love for each other and the lives of those they love.

Synopsis

Siski is the story of how loves and choices can change the course of lives and relationships, particularly in a society that places such perceived importance on success in life based on marriage. Colonel Baldev Sethi (Kanwaljit Singh) (or Bali as he is called affectionately in the film by those that know him), was an army veteran and commanding officer, and he values discipline; he also faces life with the same stoicism that helped him win medals of valour in combat. Pixie (Sumeet Saigal) is Bali's dearest friend, akin to a blood brother. A virile young Sardar, Bali and Pixie share a fondness for conviviality for life and the company of attractive young women, drink, and hearts as big as Punjab's farmlands. Pixie's over-possessiveness of those he loves often leads to predicaments that call for Bali to help resolve the consequences.

The great brotherhood between Bali and Pixie is threatens when they encounter Anoushka "Anu" Saxena (Neena Gupta). She is a successful career woman whose parents' hope of her finding a suitable husband is dissipating; they have greater hope for Anu's pretty younger sister Kaanchi (Tara Patel).

Cast
 Neena Gupta as Anoushka Saxena
 Kanwaljit Singh as Colonel Baldev Sethi
 Manohar Singh
 Sumeet Saigal as Pixie
 Adeela Sachdev
 Uttara Baokar
 Tara Mehta
 Tara Patel
 Mahesh

References

StarPlus original programming
2000 Indian television series debuts
Gulzar
Sikhism in fiction
Indian Armed Forces in fiction